Trevor Dion Wooley FRS (born 17 September 1964) is a British mathematician and currently Professor of Mathematics at Purdue University.  His fields of interest include analytic number theory, Diophantine equations and Diophantine problems, harmonic analysis,
the Hardy-Littlewood circle method, and the theory and applications of exponential sums.  He has made significant breakthroughs on Waring's problem, for which he was awarded the Salem Prize in 1998.

He received his bachelor's degree in 1987 from the University of Cambridge and his PhD, supervised by Robert Charles Vaughan, in 1990 from the University of London. In 2007, he was elected Fellow of the Royal Society.

Awards and honours
 Alfred P. Sloan Research Fellow, 1993–1995
 Salem Prize, 1998
Invited speaker, International Congress of Mathematicians, Beijing 2002
 Elected Fellow of the Royal Society, 2007.
 Fröhlich Prize, 2012.
 Fellow of the American Mathematical Society, 2012.
Invited speaker, International Congress of Mathematicians, Seoul 2014

Selected publications

References

External links
 

Living people
20th-century British mathematicians
21st-century British mathematicians
Purdue University faculty
Fellows of the Royal Society
Fellows of the American Mathematical Society
Alumni of Imperial College London
1964 births